The Billboard Hot 100 is a chart that ranks the best-performing singles of the United States. Published by Billboard magazine, the data are compiled by Nielsen SoundScan based collectively on each single's weekly physical and digital sales, and airplay. In 2005, there were eight singles that topped the chart in fifty-three issues of the magazine, the lowest of any year.

During the year, five acts achieved their first US number-one single, either as a lead artist or featured guest: Mario, Olivia, Gwen Stefani, Carrie Underwood, and Chris Brown. Stefani earned her first number-one single in the United States this year, although she had been with band the No Doubt since 1986. Hip hop artist Kanye West gained his first number-one single, "Gold Digger", as lead artist; West previously had a number-one single with "Slow Jamz", a 2004 song by rapper Twista. Two acts, Underwood and Brown, scored a number-one debut single this year. Mariah Carey was the only act to have more than one number one song, with her earning two.

Mariah Carey's "We Belong Together" is the longest-running single of 2005, topping the Billboard Hot 100 for 14 non-consecutive weeks. To date, it is tied for the longest-running number-one single of the decade, and second in the entire Hot 100 era behind Boyz II Men's and Carey's 1995 single "One Sweet Day", which spent sixteen weeks at number one. West's "Gold Digger" is the second longest-running, having peaked the chart for 10 consecutive weeks. Other singles with extended chart runs include R&B singer Mario's "Let Me Love You", his best-performing song to date, and rapper 50 Cent's "Candy Shop", each spent nine straight weeks at number one.

Carey is the only artist to have earned two number-one singles in 2005 after "Don't Forget About Us" topped the chart in the final calendar issue of Billboard Hot 100. "Don't Forget About Us" is Carey's 17th number-one single, placing her second in the list of acts with most number ones in the United States, tying with Elvis Presley.  "We Belong Together" is the best-performing single of the chart year, topping the Top Hot 100 Hits of 2005; this gave Carey her first number-one single in the year-end chart.

Chart history

Number-one artists

See also
2005 in music
List of Billboard number-one singles
Billboard Year-End Hot 100 singles of 2005

References

Additional sources
Fred Bronson's Billboard Book of Number 1 Hits, 5th Edition
Joel Whitburn's Top Pop Singles 1955-2008, 12 Edition
Joel Whitburn Presents the Billboard Hot 100 Charts: The 2000s
Additional information obtained can be verified within Billboard's online archive services and print editions of the magazine.

United States Hot 100
2005